Gilberto Hinojosa is an American politician. He is the chair of the Texas Democratic Party. Hinojosa was the county judge of Cameron County, Texas from 1995 to 2006.

Early career

While living in Washington, DC, Hinojosa worked as a Staff Attorney for the Migrant Legal Action Program, Inc. He later became the Director of the Migrant Division of Colorado Rural Legal Services, Inc., in Denver, Colorado. Upon his return to his native Texas, Hinojosa continued practicing law as the Managing Attorney for the Texas Rural Legal Aid, Inc., located in Brownsville, Texas. Although he briefly partnered with another law firm it was only until 1995 that he established his law firm of Magallanes & Hinojosa, P.C., in Brownsville, Texas.

County judge
Hinojosa was elected Cameron County Judge on November 8, 1994. During his administration, international bridges to Mexico were built and the restoration of the 1912 era courthouse was completed. The Dancy Building now houses the present county administration.

On August 11, 2003, Hinojosa appeared before the United States Senate Committee on Environment and Public Works in support of Senate Bill 1329, which would provide assistance in the relocation of railroads to improve access for commercial traffic passing through Cameron County to and from the international border with Mexico. During his statement, he also voiced his support for the planned Interstate 69 project. After the bill passed, the Cameron County West Rail Relocation Project was initiated which provided for the construction of a railroad across the Rio Grande from Brownsville, Texas, to Matamoros, Tamaulipas, Mexico, with approximately $21 million in federal funds provided. The present administration of Judge Carlos Cascos continues to work towards completion of this project.

County Democratic Chairman
Hinojosa was elected Chairman of the Cameron County Democratic Party on November 12, 2007. One day after the inauguration of President Barack Obama, Hinojosa attended the Democratic National Committee Winter Meeting held in Washington, DC.  On January 23, 2008, he nominated Virginia Governor Tim Kaine to head the Democratic National Committee. Thereafter, a unanimous vote made Governor Kaine the new leader of the Democratic National Committee.

Texas Democratic Party Chairmanship

On May 12, 2011, Hinojosa announced his intention to run for Chair of the Texas Democratic Party upon incumbent Boyd Richie announcing he would not run for re-election. He named Houston Attorney Cris Felman treasurer of his campaign. Hinojosa was elected Chair of the Texas Democratic Party on June 9, 2012 at the state party convention held in Houston. He replaced Boyd Richie, who retired.

Personal life 
Hinojosa is the father of Xochitl Hinojosa, the 2020 Democratic National Convention spokesperson.

References

External links

1952 births
County judges in Texas
Hispanic and Latino American politicians
Living people
People from Cameron County, Texas
People from Hidalgo County, Texas
State political party chairs of Texas
Texas Democrats